Luke-Kyle van der Smit (born 29 June 1994) is a Namibian professional rugby union player for HKU Sandy Bay RFC in Hong Kong, having previously played for  in 2015 and the  in 2016. His regular position is flanker.

Rugby career

2013–2015: Western Province

Van der Smit was born in Swakopmund in Namibia, but grew up in Cape Town, South Africa. He attended SACS, also playing first team rugby for them.

Van der Smit didn't earn provincial colours at school level, but was contracted to join 's academy after high school. He played in all twelve of 's matches during the 2013 Under-19 Provincial Championship, starting eleven of those.

Van der Smit was included in 's squad for the 2015 Vodacom Cup and he made his first class debut on 21 March 2015 against Western Cape rivals  in Caledon, coming on for the final couple of minutes of the match. He also played off the bench against the  the next week, and made his first start against the  three weeks later, also scoring the first senior try of his career in a 34–6 win.

He didn't feature in the play-offs, which Western Province won, beating the same opposition in the final.

2016: UP Tuks

2016: Eastern Province Kings

Van Der Smit was contracted by the Port Elizabeth-based  for the 2016 Currie Cup Premier Division. He made a total of six appearances for the team, but could not prevent them losing all their matches to finish bottom of the log.

References

1994 births
Living people
Eastern Province Elephants players
Namibian rugby union players
Rugby union flankers
Rugby union players from Swakopmund
South African rugby union players
Western Province (rugby union) players
Namibian expatriate rugby union players
Namibian expatriate sportspeople in Hong Kong
South African expatriate rugby union players
Rugby union players from Cape Town
University of Pretoria alumni
South African expatriate sportspeople in Hong Kong
Expatriate rugby union players in Hong Kong